Robert Sher-Machherndl is a Colorado-based choreographer and former principal dancer with the Dutch National Ballet and Bavarian State Ballet.  He is the founder and currently the artistic director of Lemon Sponge Cake Contemporary Ballet in Boulder, CO. 

Sher-Machherndl was born in Vienna, Austria. and relocated to the United States on an O-1 nonimmigrant visa (granted for aliens who possess extraordinary ability in the arts or other fields).

Career and repertoire 
Sher-Machherndl danced with the Dutch National Ballet and with the Bavarian State Ballet in the 1980s and 1990s. He relocated to the United States after his tenures with these companies and founded Lemon Sponge Cake Contemporary Ballet in Boulder, CO in 2003, under which he choreographs and performs in original works.

Additionally, Sher-Machherndl has created choreography for Finnish National Ballet, Vienna State Opera Ballet, Bavarian State Ballet, Scapino Ballet, Salzburg Ballet, Cleo Parker Robinson, Santa Fe Dance Festival, Lines Ballet BFA and Training Program, Ballet Next, University of Colorado, Colorado State University, University of Wyoming, Kuopio Dance Festival, Moving People Dance, American College Dance Festival, and Colorado Ballet Training Program.

Media recognition 
Sher-Machherndl was named 2010 Dance Person of the Year by The Denver Post. In 2015, Denver Arts & Venues’ Public Art Program commissioned his piece "White Mirror" as their first-ever dance piece commissioned.  In 2018, Dance Spirit named Lemon Sponge Cake Contemporary Ballet as one of their “10 Contemporary Ballet Companies You Should Be Obsessed With.”

Roles 
Principal roles with Dutch National Ballet and Bavarian State Ballet 

 Swan Lake
 Giselle
 Romeo and Juliet
 Onegin
 Cinderella
 Sleeping Beauty
 Nuages
 Apollo
 Stravinsky Violin Concerto
 Serenade
 Symphony in C
 Diamonds
 Concerto Barocco
 Agon
 La Valse
 Divertimento No. 15 (Mozart)
 Hammerklavier
 Grosse Fuge
 Bad Blood

Original Choreography under Lemon Sponge Cake Contemporary Ballet 

 UnCut
 Point
 PlastikPaket
 StrangeLands
 LoveCrimes
 AustriaPop
 Where Is The Love
 AustriaPop Vol 2
 Vertigo
 Le Ballet Star
 TigerLilly
 Anilla
 Mozart 250
 Alien Nation
 Leopoldstadt 22
 Project Peace
 Gala 2007
 I Am Happy for this Moment
 This Moment Is Your Life
 I Trust You To Kill Me
 A Strange Land
 Liquid-Space
 White Mirror
 Vertical Migration
 Bach 260
 White Fields
 GONE

References 

Year of birth missing (living people)
Living people
Austrian male ballet dancers
Austrian choreographers
Dutch National Ballet principal dancers